Johan Morielle Santos (born June 1, 1987) is a Filipino television actor, presenter, and model who participated in 133 episodes of Philippine reality show Pinoy Big Brother: Double Up.

Background
Santos was a student of the Lyceum of the Philippines University - Manila before he joined PBB. After two years on the series StarStruck, Santos joined the cast of the 2010 spinoff series Melason In Love. A restaurant server, Santos was a former contestant of the reality series Pinoy Big Brother: Double Up, and crowned fourth "Big Placer" on Day 133.

He currently resides in Quezon City.

Filmography

Television

Film

Awards and nominations

References

External links
 

1987 births
Living people
Filipino male models
People from Tarlac City
Male actors from Tarlac
Participants in Philippine reality television series
StarStruck (Philippine TV series) participants
GMA Network personalities
Pinoy Big Brother contestants
ABS-CBN personalities
Lyceum of the Philippines University alumni